T.J. (Julian) Bushoff (born 21 March 1997) is a Dutch politician from the Labour Party. In 2022, he replaced Khadija Arib in the House of Representatives after she resigned, he moved up the list.

References

See also 

 List of members of the House of Representatives of the Netherlands, 2021–present

Living people
1997 births
People from Groningen (city)
21st-century Dutch politicians
Labour Party (Netherlands) politicians
Members of the House of Representatives (Netherlands)